Teuvo Hakkarainen (born 12 April 1960, in Viitasaari) is a Finnish politician and member of the European Parliament, representing the Finns Party. Before being elected to the European Parliament in the 2019 election, he had been a member of the Finnish Parliament since 2011.

On 10 June 2017, Hakkarainen was elected the Second Vice Chairman of the Finns Party. He served in the position until December 2017, when Hakkarainen resigned the post after he had sexually harassed a fellow member of parliament.

Views and comments

Sexual minorities 
In May 2011, Hakkarainen was talking to junior high school students. When some students asked Hakkarainen's opinion about gay adoptions, he told students that "if two gays have a child, the child would become a double gay", and said that he did so jokingly because he would rather answer questions regarding government talks.

In October 2011, Hakkarainen told the tabloid Ilta-Sanomat that homosexuals, lesbians and Somalis ought to be deported to Åland to form their own society.

Death penalty 
On 16 December 2015, a member of Finnish Parliament, a member of Finns Party, Hakkarainen inquired Minister of Justice, also member of the same party, if capital punishment could be re-enacted, referring to the court case against two asylum seekers. They were suspected of 11 murders committed with terrorist intent in Iraq, but were released.

Racism 

In April 2011, Hakkarainen openly expressed his opinions towards black people and Muslims in an interview with Helsingin Sanomat. During the interview Hakkarainen used a pejorative word neekeriukko (which translates to male "negro" or "nigger" and is considered as an offensive racial slur). He also made a mocking imitation of the Islamic call to prayer.

The Ombudsman for Minorities of Finland, Eva Biaudet, asked the Prosecutor General of Finland to investigate if Hakkarainen may be guilty in some crimes according to the criminal codex for example incitement to ethnic or racial hatred. Later The Finnish Police announced that they did not feel that comments made by Hakkarainen give cause for a criminal investigation. Police proposed to the Prosecutor General that no criminal investigation should be launched, saying that Hakkarainen's comments were an exercise of free speech, and not hate speech. Hakkarainen defended his statements by claiming that he comes from a rural background.

In January 2017, Hakkarainen was convicted of incitement against an ethnic group.

2017 sexual harassment case 
In December 2017, Hakkarainen assaulted MP Veera Ruoho in the parliament house. The incident occurred at the parliament café where Ruoho was having a break during a debate, while the Finns Party were celebrating their Christmas party. Ruoho was sitting on a table as Hakkarainen grabbed her neck from behind and forcefully kissed her in the face. According to Ruoho, she was scared for her neck and her mouth hurt as well. Hakkarainen was under the influence of alcohol. He was convicted of assault and sexual harassment for fines of 5,440 euros.

Personal life 
He was a co-owner of Haka Wood saw mill in Viitasaari, but sold his shares shortly after being elected. Ilta-Sanomat reported that Haka-Wood has been granted 461 750 euros European union subsidies for a development project which has not be reimbursed fully emphasizing that Hakkarainen is eurosceptic – though most of the national subsidies are forbidden by EU regulations. Haka-Wood has and will receive during its development programme funds from European Regional Development Fund. Hakkarainen stated to Helsingin Sanomat that money is paid there and taken from there (the EU funds). Haka-Wood needs the subsidies for a new sorting line. Hakkarainen has worked as a sawmill consultant in Honduras, Nicaragua, Guatemala and El Salvador.

In 1986, Hakkarainen was a member in a gang that broke into the Suomussalmi church and stole 125 eucharist chalices, 24 bottles of sacramental wine and the money offerings. He was given a 9 months suspended sentence.

References

External links
Home page 

1960 births
Living people
People from Viitasaari
Finnish Pentecostals
Finns Party politicians
Members of the Parliament of Finland (2011–15)
Members of the Parliament of Finland (2015–19)
Members of the Parliament of Finland (2019–23)
MEPs for Finland 2019–2024
Politicians convicted of sex offences
People convicted of burglary